The  is a single-car diesel multiple unit (DMU) train type operated by Central Japan Railway Company (JR Central) and Tokai Transport Service Company (TKJ) on driver-only operated rural services in central Japan. A total of 43 cars were built between 1989 and 1999, with the class divided into four sub-classes: KiHa 11-0, KiHa 11-100, KiHa 11-200, and KiHa 11-300.

Build details
The fleet build details are as follows.

KiHa 11-0
Ten KiHa 11-0 cars (KiHa 11-1–10) were delivered to Ise Depot from Niigata Tekkō (now Niigata Transys) between January and February 1989.

KiHa 11-9 was withdrawn in 2007 due to accident damage.

Interior
Seating is arranged with 2+2 abreast transverse seating and longitudinal seating at the car ends. Seating capacity is 60, with a total capacity of 110 passengers. These cars are not equipped with toilets.

KiHa 11-100

23 KiHa 11-100 cars (KiHa 11-101–123) were delivered from Niigata Tekkō (now Niigata Transys) between January and March 1989. Cars KiHa 11-122 and 123 were built at JR Central's Nagoya factory. Basically similar to the KiHa 11-0 design, these cars are designed for use in colder climate areas, and were initially all allocated to Mino-Ōta Depot, although six cars, 107–112, were transferred to Ise Depot in March 1990.

KiHa 11-200

Four KiHa 11-200 cars (KiHa 11-201–204) were built by Niigata Tekkō (now Niigata Transys) in 1993 for use on the Tōkai Transport Service Jōhoku Line. These cars are based on the KiHa 11-100 design, but without internal door steps. KiHa 11-203–204 were subsequently reallocated to JR Central's Mino-Ōta Depot and are used interchangeably with other JR Central KiHa 11s.

KiHa 11-201 was withdrawn from Johoku Line services on 23 September 2015, and sold to the Hitachinaka Kaihin Railway in Ibaraki Prefecture. The other car owned by TKJ, Kiha 11-202, was withdrawn in March 2016 after its final run on 19 March, and moved to the Hitachinaka Kaihin Railway later in March.

KiHa 11-300
Six 2nd-batch KiHa 11-300 cars (KiHa 11-301–306) were delivered to Ise Depot from Niigata Tekkō (now Niigata Transys) in March 1999. These differ significantly from earlier cars in having unpainted stainless steel bodies. Passenger windows are 50 mm taller and 140 mm wider than on earlier batches. They are equipped with universal access toilets and a wheelchair space, reducing seating capacity to 46, but with the overall capacity remaining at 110 passengers.

The KiHa 11-300 cars are normally used on the Meishō Line.

Two former JR Central cars were transferred to the TKJ to replace older KiHa 11-200 series cars, following modifications, including the addition of LCD passenger information screens. KiHa 11-301 entered service on the line from 24 September 2015, and KiHa 11-302 was transferred in March 2016. In June 2016, car KiHa 11-302 received a modified livery, with an orange band at window level similar to the style of the KiHa 11-200s replacing the orange waistline stripe inherited from JR Central.

Resale

Hitachinaka Seaside Railway
In April 2015, three former JR Central cars, KiHa 11-123/203/204, were sold to the Hitachinaka Seaside Railway in Ibaraki Prefecture. Two more KiHa 11-200 series cars formerly owned by TKJ were resold to the Hitachinaka Seaside Railway in 2015 and 2016. Of these, KiHa 11-201 was moved by road to the Hitachinaka Seaside Railway in September 2015, and KiHa 11-202 was moved by road to the Hitachinaka Seaside Railway in March 2016.

Myanmar
16 former KiHa 11 cars were shipped to Myanmar in 2015.

References

External links

 JR Central KiHa 11 information 

11
Central Japan Railway Company
Train-related introductions in 1989